Sweet Homes Group of Companies is a real estate business in the United Arab Emirates. The company was started in 2003 and primarily functions in Dubai and Ajman. The group is into general engineering & contracting, general trading and real estate brokerage, managements agents and consultancy.

Projects 

Ajman Uptown (USD 598 Million)

 Hotel Apartments (USD 38 Million)

References 

Real estate companies established in 2003
Real estate and property developers
Property companies of the United Arab Emirates
Emirati brands